Czechoslovakia competed at the 1976 Summer Olympics in Montreal, Quebec, Canada. 163 competitors, 125 men and 38 women, took part in 79 events in 16 sports.

Medalists

Athletics

Men's Discus Throw
 Ludvík Daněk
 Qualification — 60.44m
 Final — 61.28m (→ 9th place)
 Josef Šilhavý
 Qualification — 60.82m
 Final — 58.42m (→ 13th place)

Women's Shot Put
Helena Fibingerová
Final — 20.76 m (→  Bronze Medal)

Basketball

Men's team competition
Preliminary round (group B):
 Defeated Egypt (103-64) 
 Lost to Yugoslavia (81-99) 
 Lost to Italy (69-79) 
 Defeated Puerto Rico (89-83) 
 Lost to United States (76-81)
Classification Matches:
 5th/8th place: Defeated Cuba (91-79)
 5th/6th place: Lost to Italy (75-98) → Sixth place
Team Roster
Vladimir Ptacek
Vojtech Petr
Jiri Konopasek
Justin Sedlak
Stanislav Kropilak
Jaroslav Kanturek
Zdenek Kos
Jiri Pospisil
Vladimir Padrta
Kamil Brabenec
Zdenek Dousa
Gustav Hraska
Head coach: Vladimir Heger

Women's team competition
Team Roster
Ludmila Kraliková
Dana Ptacková
Pavla Davidová
Ludmila Chmeliková
Martina Babková
Ivana Korinková
Ywetta Pollaková
Lenka Nechvatalová
Vlasta Vrbková
Marta Pechová
Hana Dousová
Bozena Miklosovicové
Head coach: Jindrich Drasal

Canoeing

Cycling

Eleven cyclists represented Czechoslovakia in 1976.

Individual road race
 Vlastimil Moravec — 4:49:01 (→ 13th place) 
 Petr Bucháček — 4:54:26 (→ 41st place) 
 Petr Matoušek — did not finish (→ no ranking)
 Vladimír Vondráček — did not finish (→ no ranking)

Team time trial
 Petr Bucháček
 Petr Matoušek
 Milan Puzrla
 Vladimír Vondráček

Sprint
 Anton Tkáč —  Gold Medal

1000m time trial
 Miroslav Vymazal — 1:08.173 (→ 9th place)

Individual pursuit
 Michal Klasa — 8th place

Team pursuit
 Zdeněk Dohnal
 Michal Klasa
 Petr Kocek
 Jiří Pokorný

Diving

Fencing

Three fencers, two men and one woman, represented Czechoslovakia in 1976.

Men's foil
 František Koukal
 Jaroslav Jurka

Men's épée
 Jaroslav Jurka

Women's foil
 Katarína Lokšová-Ráczová

Gymnastics

Handball

Judo

Modern pentathlon

Three male pentathletes represented Czechoslovakia in 1976. They won silver in the team event and Jan Bártů won an individual bronze.

Individual
 Jan Bártů
 Bohumil Starnovský
 Jiří Adam

Team
 Jan Bártů
 Bohumil Starnovský
 Jiří Adam

Rowing

Shooting

Swimming

Volleyball

Men's team competition
Preliminary round (group A)
 Defeated Canada (3-0)
 Lost to Cuba (0-3)
 Lost to Poland (1-3)
 Defeated South Korea (3-1)
Classification Matches
 5th/8th place: Defeated Italy (3-0)
 5th/6th place: Defeated South Korea (3-1) → Fifth place
Team Roster
Miroslav Nekola
Jaroslav Penc
Stefan Pipa
Vladimír Petlák
Josef Mikunda
Jaroslav Stančo
Vlastimil Lenert
Milan Šlambor
Pavel Řeřábek
Josef Vondrka
Drahomír Koudelka
Jaroslav Tomáš
Head coaches: Pavel Schenk and Zdeněk Václavík

Weightlifting

Wrestling

References 

Nations at the 1976 Summer Olympics
1976 Summer Olympics
Summer Olympics